Tremembé a.k.a. Teremembé is an extinct and unattested language of Brazil. It was originally spoken by the Tremembé people, who once inhabited the northern Brazilian coasts from Pará to Ceará.  The Tremembé were described as a "Tapuia" tribe - that is, not one of the dominant Tupi–Guarani peoples of the coasts.

References

 Fabre, Alain (2005): "Tremembé" (Diccionario etnolingüístico y guía bibliográfica de los pueblos indígenas sudamericanos.)

Unattested languages of South America
Indigenous languages of Northeastern Brazil